Pseudis minuta (common name: lesser swimming frog) is a species of aquatic frog in the family Hylidae. It is found in northeastern Argentina, Uruguay, and southern Brazil, and is likely to be found in southern Paraguay.

Description
Males measure  and females  in snout–vent length. The snout is truncate in lateral profile. The fingers are slender. Hind limbs are relatively long and slender. Dorsal coloration is light green or brownish, usually with small dark blotches; sometimes a distinct light middorsal band is present. A light longitudinal stripe runs through most of the flank. The thighs have usually three distinct stripes.

Males call mostly during the night, floating on the water surface and holding to vegetation. They may also call from leaves of water hyacinths, with body completely out of water. The call repertoire consists of an advertisement call and two different aggressive calls. Male–male agonistic interactions involve both advertisement and aggressive calls, and may also involve wrestling.

Habitat and conservation
It can also thrive in rice plantations. There are no known major threats, at it even appears to tolerate environments (i.e., rice plantations) that receive heavy doses of pesticides. It is present in several protected areas.

References

minuta
Amphibians of Argentina
Amphibians of Brazil
Amphibians of Uruguay
Amphibians described in 1858
Taxa named by Albert Günther
Taxonomy articles created by Polbot